Aegoschema is a genus of beetles in the family Cerambycidae. It contains the following species:

 Aegoschema adspersum (Thomson, 1860)
 Aegoschema barnouini Tavakilian & Neouze, 2013
 Aegoschema cinereum Lane, 1938
 Aegoschema fanchonae Tavakilian & Neouze, 2013
 Aegoschema migueli Monne & Mermudes, 2007
 Aegoschema moniliferum (White, 1855)
 Aegoschema morvanae Tavakilian & Neouze, 2013
 Aegoschema obesum (Bates, 1861)
 Aegoschema peruvianum Lane, 1973

References

Acanthoderini